Enrique Almaraz y Santos S.T.D. (22 September 1847 – 22 January 1922) was a Cardinal of the Roman Catholic Church and Archbishop of Seville and, later, Archbishop of Toledo and so Primate of Spain.

Early life and priesthood
Enrique Almaraz was born in La Vellés, Salamanca Province. He was educated at the Central Seminary of Salamanca where in 1876 he was awarded a doctorate in theology.
 
He was ordained in the diocese of Salamanca and remained there doing pastoral work. He served as a faculty member of the Seminary of Salamanca and was canon schoolmaster at the cathedral of Salamanca in 1874. During this time he was created Privy chamberlain. He was transferred to Madrid where he was a preacher of the Royal Chamber at the Court of the King.  He served as secretary to the bishop of Madrid and was a faculty member of the Seminary of Madrid. He was elected Vicar capitular of Madrid in April 1886.

Episcopate 
Pope Leo XIII appointed him bishop of Palencia on 18 January 1893 and he was consecrated on 16 April. He was a Senator of the Spanish Kingdom from 1899 to 1902. He was  promoted to the metropolitan see of Seville on 18 April 1907. He was reappointed as Senator of the Spanish Kingdom in November 1907, serving until his death.

Cardinalate 
He was created Cardinal-Priest of San Pietro in Montorio by Pope Pius X 
in the consistory of 27 November 1911. He participated in the conclave of 1914 that elected Pope Benedict XV. He was transferred to the primatial see of Toledo on 16 December 1920. 

He died on 22 January 1922 in Madrid, and was buried in the metropolitan cathedral of Toledo.

References

 

1847 births
1922 deaths
People from the Province of Salamanca
20th-century Spanish cardinals
Archbishops of Toledo
Roman Catholic archbishops of Seville
Cardinals created by Pope Pius X